Barceloneta is a station belonging to line L4 of Barcelona Metro. It is located in La Barceloneta neighbourhood, close to the beach and Parc de la Ciutadella. This is the station nearest to Barcelona França railway station, one of the city's major railway stations and one of the R2 commuter line stops.

The station is the least deep underground metro station in the whole system.

History
Construction was slow due to problems, including the explosion which occurred in November 1973.

Finally, the station opened on 15 March 1976 at 3pm, with visitors like Joaquín Viola, by then mayor of Barcelona. In 2008, the station was made accessible for disabled people.

See also
Estació de França

References

Trenscat

Railway stations in Spain opened in 1976
Transport in Ciutat Vella
Barcelona Metro line 4 stations